Barrio Yungay is a neighborhood of Santiago, Chile, located to the west of the city center in the commune of Santiago and to the west of Barrio Brasil.

History
This neighborhood was a rural area until 1835. The land was owned by José Santiago Portales Larraín, who was the father of Diego Portales. After the death of the head of the family, the  that made up the estate were divided into lots. The westernmost portion was purchased by the Chilean State for the purpose of creating the Quinta Normal de Agricultura. The Plaza Yungay and the San Saturnino parish church, which are the heart of the neighborhood, were created on the land inherited by Diego Portales.

Barrio Yungay was officially born in 1839 as a way of commemorating the Chilean victory in the Battle of Yungay.

References

External links

Neighborhoods in Santiago, Chile